Göldere can refer to:

 Göldere, Bayburt
 Göldere, Keban